Nusser or Nüsser is a surname. Notable people with this name include:

Josef Mayr-Nusser (1910–1945), Catholic martyr for refusing to become a Nazi soldier
Andrés Nusser, founding member of Astro (Chilean band)
Franz Nusser, Austrian meteorologist, namesake of Nusser Island
James Nusser (1905–1979), actor in Gunsmoke
Josef Nüsser (born 1931), Czech skier and Olympian
Larissa Nusser (born 2000), Dutch handball player
Laura Nusser, victim of serial killer Vincent Johnson
Robert Nusser (1931–2001), Austrian ice hockey player and Olympian
Sarah Nusser (born 1957), American statistician
Stefan Nusser, CEO of Redwood Robotics
Zoltan Nusser, Hungarian physiologist

See also
Nußhardt, a German mountain also sometimes called Nusser